Gecko Gear is an Australian design and manufacturing company  specializing in iPod, iPad and iPhone accessories   as well as other computer related products. It maintains warehouses in Melbourne and in Shenzhen, China, but keeps design operations in Melbourne in order to maintain focus on quality control of the final product. The company has expanded from Australia to the European, Latin American, and Middle Eastern markets. The brand is also sold in Radio Shack stores in the United States.

References

Manufacturing companies based in Melbourne
Manufacturing companies established in 2004
Australian companies established in 2004